Carsten Ball and Chris Guccione won the first edition of the tournament 6–3, 3–6, [11–9] in the final against Jordan Kerr and John-Patrick Smith.

Seeds

Draw

Draw

References
 Main Draw

Copa Internacional de Tenis Total Digest - Doubles
2013 Doubles